Galen Laius Gering (born February 13, 1971) is an American actor most known for his portrayal of characters on daytime soap operas. He currently plays the role of Rafe Hernandez on the long-running NBC soap opera Days of Our Lives. He also appeared on the NBC daytime soap opera Passions as Luis Lopez-Fitzgerald.

Early life 
Galen Laius Gering was born in Los Angeles, California, to Alan Gering and Michele de Oñate, a renowned west coast artist. He is of Russian Jewish descent on his father's side, and French and Spanish/Basque descent on his mother's side (one of his maternal great-grandfathers was a Basque immigrant). He has an older sister, Charissa.  Gering was close to his grandmother, who was also an artist.

At the age of 18, Gering moved to New York City to start a modeling career and finished high school remotely.  He traveled Europe as a model before attending New York University for a year.  Gering finished college at the University of Miami where he studied creative writing and film.

Career 
In 1999, Gering learned of a role in an upcoming NBC daytime soap called Passions through Irene Marie Models.  By the time Gering graduated from UM, he was already taping Passions, on which he had landed the role of Officer Luis Lopez-Fitzgerald. Gering was named one of People's 50 Most Beautiful People in 2000, and remained with Passions until its cancellation in 2008.

On October 31, 2008, Gering debuted on another NBC soap, Days of Our Lives, as Rafe Hernandez, an FBI agent who is hired to guard Sami Brady while she is under witness protection. He has also appeared in over 50 national commercials.

On September 25, 2011, Gering and his wife, Jenna, starred on the E! reality series Dirty Soap together with their kids. The show ended on November 13, 2011, after only one season.

Filmography

Personal life 
Gering is married to Jenna Hudlett and they have two sons together.

See also 
Lopez-Fitzgerald family
Supercouple

References

External links 
Galen Gering Official Web Site

1971 births
American male soap opera actors
Male models from California
University of Miami alumni
Male actors from Los Angeles
Living people
20th-century American male actors
21st-century American male actors
Jewish American male actors
21st-century American Jews